Knud Ejgild Christophersen (15 November 1905 - 8 March 1975) was a Danish football defender with Frem and the Danish national team and a handball goalkeeper with Efterslægten.

Christophersen who won Danish Championships with Frem in 1931 and 1933 was committee member of the Copenhagen Football Association in the years 1935–1937.

Honours
Team
Danish Championships: 1930-31 and 1932-33 with Frem
Danish Cup: 1927 with Frem

External links
Danish national team profile

1905 births
1975 deaths
Danish men's footballers
Denmark international footballers
Boldklubben Frem players
Footballers from Copenhagen
Danish male handball players
Association football defenders